The Mount Benson wine region  is a wine region in the south east of the Australian state of South Australia located on the continental coastline about  from the state capital of Adelaide and halfway between the towns of Kingston SE and Robe.  Mount Benson is one of six wine growing regions that are located in the Limestone Coast wine zone.

History
The region's first grapes were planted in the 1980s by local farmers well attuned to Mount Benson's climatic conditions.  These grapes would later make way for the region's own style of delicate, cool-climate, maritime-influenced wines.

Viticulture and climate
The Mount Benson vineyards are planted on gently undulating terrain ranging from five to 50 metres above sea level and attracted the interest of viticulturalists due to prevalent loam-based terra rossa soils that sit atop free-draining limestone, which formed over millions of years while the region was underwater.  Shells and skeletal remains of marine animals deposited on the shallow sands of what is now the Limestone Coast, and under the ocean's weight these remains fused together to form a layer of soft limestone.
 
Terra rossa soil, arguably the most famous vineyard soil in Australia, is produced as the limestone weathers and the clay contained in the rocks is left behind.  Where this clay sits above the water table oxidation occurs, forming rust and giving the soil is characteristic red colour.

A moderate maritime climate is ideal from a viticultural point of view. Cold and wet winters and long, cool and dry growing seasons are typical in the region. Strong winds prevailing from the south in spring and summer keep foliage dry and disease at bay. Winter frosts are  moderated by the coastal location, as are summer temperature extremes. These conditions provide the foundation to an elegant and delicate style of wines.
 Map coordinates: 36.97°S, 139.72°E
 Altitude: 5-150m
 Heat Degree Days (Oct-Apr): 1443.7
 Average annual rainfall: 483.2mm
 Growing Season rainfall: 170.5mm
 Mean January maximum: 24.6 °C
 Relative humidity (Oct-Apr, 3pm): 58%
 Harvest: late February – early May

Mount Benson is home to five cellar doors, each showcasing wine varieties which express Mount Benson's coastal locality and soils.

Grape varieties
Red grape varieties represent 75% of all grapes grown in the region, with the majority of Mount Benson planted to Cabernet Sauvignon, but also including substantial plantings of Shiraz, Merlot, Pinot noir, Cabernet Franc and Petit Verdot. White varieties consist of Chardonnay and Sauvignon blanc, as well as Cygne blanc, Pinot gris, Riesling, Semillon, Verdelho and Viognier.

See also

South Australian wine

Citations and references

Citations

References

External links
 Mount Benson Vignerons Association webpage
Mount Benson Wine Region official South Australian Tourism Commission webpage

Limestone Coast
Wine regions of South Australia